New York City Economic Development Corporation (NYCEDC) is a nonprofit corporation whose stated mission is to "leverage the city’s assets to create beneficial jobs that drive growth. This ensures equitable and  sustainable development across all five boroughs."

History

NYCEDC was formed in 1991 as the result of a merger of two major not-for-profit and a handful of minor corporations which performed economic development services for the City. One of the major merger partners was the Public Development Corporation (PDC), formed in 1966 to rescue the City from its then-deteriorating economy by selling City property and leasing industrial space. PDC was responsible for construction of the Nassau Street Mall, the Brooklyn Army Terminal, Jamaica Center, and the South Street Seaport, among other activities.  The second major merger partner was the Financial Services Corporation (FSC) originally formed in 1979 as the NYC Economic Capital Corporation to administer government financing programs that promote business expansion in New York City. Formation of the NYCEDC followed recommendations from the consulting firm McKinsey & Company, who had been engaged in mid-1990 to "advise on the reorganisation of the NYC development system.

Carl Weisbrod, formerly of PDC prior to its merger with FSC, was the first president of NYCEDC under the Dinkins administration. Weisbrod was succeeded by Charles Millard and Michael G. Carey under the Giuliani administration, followed by Andrew Alper, the first president appointed to the position during the Bloomberg administration. Robert C. Lieber was appointed in January 2007 and served until Mayor Michael R. Bloomberg appointed him as Deputy Mayor for Economic Development & Rebuilding in December 2007. Seth Pinsky served as President from February 2008 to August 2013.

Applied Sciences NYC

One of NYCEDC’s largest initiatives to date is Applied Sciences NYC, a competition to create a new world-class engineering campus in NYC.  In December 2011, Mayor Bloomberg announced the selection of a historic partnership with Cornell University and the Technion-Israel Institute of Technology to create a groundbreaking, two-million-square foot applied science and engineering campus on Roosevelt Island, to be called Cornell Tech.  Applied Sciences NYC is expected to more than double the number of both full-time graduate engineering students and faculty in New York City. Over the next three decades the Applied Sciences NYC initiative is expected to generate more than $33 billion in overall nominal economic impact, add over 48,000 jobs, and launch nearly 1,000 spin-off companies. The Applied Sciences NYC initiative also includes the establishment of a campus in Downtown Brooklyn developed by a consortium led by NYU that focuses on the challenges facing cities, and a new institute for data sciences at Columbia University.

Governance
The Mayor of New York appoints seven members, including the chairperson. Ten additional members are appointed by the Mayor from nominees of the Borough Presidents and the Speaker of the New York City Council. Each Borough President nominates one member and the Speaker nominates five. Ten are appointed by the Chairperson from a list of persons approved by the Mayor. NYCEDC is not a New York City agency.

In April 2021, restaurateur Danny Meyer was named as chairman.

Other entities

New York City Industrial Development Agency (NYCIDA) is a public benefit corporation under New York State law that provides companies with access to tax-exempt bond financing or tax benefits to strengthen and diversify the City’s tax and employment base, helps businesses locate and expand their operations within New York City, and encourages economic development by retaining jobs and creating new ones. NYCIDA is administered by NYCEDC.

New York City Capital Resource Corporation (NYCCRC), also administered by NYCEDC, is a local development corporation that provides lower-cost financing programs for eligible capital projects to qualified not-for-profit institutions and manufacturing, industrial, and other businesses.

Public projects

NYCEDC's joint projects with New York City as of 2018 include:
 
 Hunts Point, Bronx
 Coney Island, Brooklyn
 Sunset Park Waterfront, Brooklyn 
 125th Street, Manhattan
 Essex Crossing, Manhattan
 The High Line, Manhattan
 The Hub, Bronx
 Downtown Jamaica Initiatives, Queens 
 Gotham Center, Queens 
 Hunter's Point South, Queens
 Willets Point, Queens
 East River Ferry Service 
 St. George Terminal, Staten Island
 Kingsbridge Armory, Bronx 
 New York Wheel, Staten Island
 Empire Outlets, Staten Island
 Seward Park, Manhattan
 Brooklyn Army Terminal, Brooklyn

Controversial projects

In November 2018, the news media reported that Amazon.com was in final talks with the government of New York State to construct one of two campuses for its proposed Amazon HQ2 at Queens West in Long Island City. (The other campus would be located at National Landing in Crystal City, Arlington, Virginia.) The selection was confirmed by Amazon on November 13, 2018, but on February 14, 2019, Amazon announced it was pulling out, citing unexpected opposition from local lawmakers and unions.

Waterfront rehabilitation

NYCEDC has been involved in plans to redevelop miles of the City’s working waterfront. It states that it helps improve public access to waterfronts through projects such as the construction of the East River Waterfront Esplanade along a two-mile shorefront of Lower Manhattan.

References

Notes

Project information

External links

 
 NYCEDC: Transforming New York City (video)

Public benefit corporations in New York (state)
Investment promotion agencies
1991 establishments in New York City
Organizations established in 1991
Economic development organizations in the United States